Mohamad Hasbullah bin Abu Bakar (born 26 October 1994) is a Malaysian footballer who plays for Negeri Sembilan FC.

Club career
Hasbullah is a product of the Johor Football Association. He penned a youth contract with Malaysian Super League outfit Johor FC in 2012. For 2013 season, Hasbullah played for Malaysia Premier League side Johor FA.

Hasbullah had been promoted to Johor Darul Ta'zim's first team after his amazing performance at Johor Darul Ta'zim II.

He was officially announced as a new Negeri Sembilan FC player on 13 January 2023.

Honours

Club
Johor Darul Ta'zim
Malaysia Super League: 2017
Malaysia Cup: 2017
 Malaysia Charity Shield (1): 2019

References

External links
 
 Profile at footballmalaysia

1994 births
Malaysian footballers
Living people
People from Johor
Johor Darul Ta'zim F.C. players
Negeri Sembilan FC players
Malaysia Super League players
Association football forwards
Association football midfielders